Anton Charles Palepoi (born January 19, 1978) is a former American football defensive end. He played five seasons in the National Football League, most notably with the Seattle Seahawks (2002–2004).

Early years
Palepoi attended high school at Hunter High School in West Valley City, Utah where he played basketball and football for the Wolverines. Taking the junior college route, he went on to attend Dixie College, where he was named Western States Football League Most Valuable Player in 1999 after leading the Red Storm to an appearance in the junior college national championship game.

Recruited by Ken Niumatalolo, he chose Nevada–Las Vegas over Utah. Palepoi was an All-Mountain West Conference selection in both of his years at UNLV, despite having his senior season cut short to only six games.

Professional career
Despite being projected as an undrafted free agent, Palepoi was selected in the second round, 60th overall, by the Seattle Seahawks. He was the highest selected player from UNLV since Ickey Woods in 1988.

He played for the Seattle Seahawks, Denver Broncos, and Arizona Cardinals, before signing with the New Orleans Saints in May 2007.

Personal
Palepoi was born to Tony and Tutaga Palepoi, both Brigham Young University graduates. His father played for the Samoa national rugby union team. His younger brother Tenny Palepoi is a defensive lineman for the San Diego Chargers.

Also had a small appearance in the movie Wish Upon a Star starring Katherine Heigl which was filmed at Hunter High School.

References

External links
UNLV Rebels bio

1978 births
Living people
American football defensive ends
UNLV Rebels football players
Seattle Seahawks players
Denver Broncos players
Arizona Cardinals players
New Orleans Saints players
People from West Valley City, Utah
Players of American football from American Samoa
American sportspeople of Samoan descent